Alleppey Green Cardamom is a green variety of kiln dried Cardamom capsule grown in Cardamom Hills of Idukki district in Kerala. 

This cardamom variety is called Alleppey cardamom not because it's grown in Alleppey, Kerala rather it's because Alleppey was the main depot through which this cardamom was processed in erstwhile Travancore.    In 18th century kings of Travancore brought state monopoly over trade and export of cardamom. The understanding between kings with British Raj, Travancore–Dutch Wars, consolidation of power under Marthanda Varma with British aid etc. were the reasons why such monopoly had come. This made all produce of cardamom in Travancore state to be sold solely to the state depot at Alleppey. Back then Alappuzha was  the major port in Travancore. This led to development of cardamom sorting and processing in Alleppey which resulted the naming of the most high quality cardamom produce from the region as Alleppey Green Cardamom. Post rise of Kochi market and port, Independence of India,  Travancore–Cochin merger the relevance and existence of a port in Alleppey became a thing of past. Today the development of better processing facilities, abundance of raw material, skilled cheap labour and allied infrastructure etc. in Idukki had resulted in complete shifting of the processing industry out of Alappuzha. 

Alleppey cardamom has a unique quality. It is kiln dried and has superior sensory quality, uniform shade of green and a three cornered ribbed appearance.

Geographical indication rights
Allepey Green Cardamom received  Intellectual Property Rights Protection or Geographical Indication (GI) status in 2005.

See also
Coorg Green Cardamom
Byadagi chilli
Bangalore Blue
Bangalore rose onion
Nanjanagud banana

References

Geographical indications in Kerala
Spices
Culture of Alappuzha district
Agriculture in Kerala